Teigen Jacqueline Allen (born 12 February 1994) is an Australian soccer player who plays for NewCastle Jets FC in the Australian W-League Australia women's national soccer team. She previously played for W-League teams Sydney FC, Western Sydney Wanderers, and Melbourne Victory as well as the Western New York Flash in the American National Women's Soccer League and Vålerenga in the Norwegian Toppserien.

Early career
Allen began her football career playing for Penrith Nepean United in Western Sydney. After five years with the club her defensive talent was scouted by W-League side Sydney FC where she earned a Scholarship with NSWIS.

NSWIS and AIS
In 2008, Allen earned a scholarship with New South Wales Institute of Sport. She earned her scholarship with The Australian Institute of Sport in 2009 and she still holds it currently.

Club career

Sydney FC, 2009–2012
Allen was 15 years of age when she started playing for the professional Australian W league Sydney Fc

Western Sydney Wanderers, 2013–2014
Allen was one of three players along with Catherine Cannuli and Servet Uzunlar, to become the first women to ever sign multi-year contracts in the W-League.

Western New York Flash, 2014
On 9 June 2014, Allen was acquired by the WNY Flash of the Women's National Soccer League in the United States.
WNY Flash defender Australian International Teigen Allen subbed in, marking her debut in the WNY Flash vs Seattle Reign on 22 June at Sahlen's Stadium. She was waived by the Western New York Flash in September 2014.

Return to Sydney FC, 2014–2016
On 29 August 2014, Allen signed with Sydney FC returning to her original home club, with two others Kyah Simon, Servet Uzunlar where all three will once again line up for the two time premiers after departing the Western Sydney Wanderers.

Melbourne City, 2016–2017
In September 2016, Allen joined Melbourne City. Melbourne City FC have become the first W-League Champions to go back-to-back after defeating Perth Glory 2–0 in the 2017 W-League Grand Final:

Vålerenga, 2017
On 31 December 2016, Vålerenga signed Allen from Melbourne City. The sports director Egil Ødegaard said she will affect the Norwegian top-flight in 2017.

Second return to Sydney FC, 2017–2018.
Allen joined Sydney FC once again ahead of the 2017–18 season.

Melbourne Victory, 2018–2020
Teigen Allen signed with Melbourne Victory for the 2018–19 W-League season. Melbourne Victory is pleased to announce it has signed Teigen Allen for the 2018/19 Westfield W-League season.
Capped 39 times for the Matildas, Allen brings a wealth of both international and W-League experience to Victory.
The signing of the talented full-back completes Jeff Hopkins' squad for the upcoming season.
"Teigen has worked really hard to earn a spot at Victory, her work ethic has been outstanding," Hopkins said.
"She is really experienced for her age and you can never have too much quality at your disposal.

Return to Melbourne City, 2020–2021
In November 2020, Allen returned to Melbourne City.

Return to Western Sydney Wanderers, 2021–
In August 2021, Allen returned to Western Sydney Wanderers for the 2021–22 W-League season.

International career
On 29 January 2008, at 13 years old, Allen played her first international with the Australian under 17's against USA at North Harbour Stadium, Auckland, New Zealand In 2009, at only 14 years of age, Allen was selected to compete at the AFC Under-19 Women's Championship. The Australians were knocked out after the group stages; however an impressive performance from Allen saw her become one of the key figures in the Australian under-16 team that won the AFC Under-16 Women's Championship later that year The Australians were knocked out after the group stages;
however an impressive performance from Allen saw her become one of the key figures in the Australian under 16's

Allen competed in the 2009 AFC Women's Championship with the Young Matildas. for the 2009 AFF U16 Women's Championship in Myanmar.

In 2010, Allen was named in the Matildas team to play in the 2010 AFC Women's Asian Cup, which the squad went on to win. Allen made her international Senior debut as a 15-year-old in the opening game again Vietnam

At the 2011 FIFA Women's World Cup in Germany, Allen was one of the youngest players in the squad. 2012 saw Allen continue cementing her place in the Matildas squad in their attempt to qualify for the 2012 London Olympics. The Australians finished third in the qualification tournament in Jinan, China, coming from behind to defeat South Korea

In May 2014, Allen competed at the AFC Women's Asian Cup and helped Australia to finish second, thereby qualifying for the 2015 FIFA Women's World Cup. She was reported as "almost unstoppable so far and virtually flawless every minute she plays."

Honours
With Awards:
 2009: Teigen Allen (Soccer) – Sydney Combined Press Sports person of the Year
 2009 Australian AFC Under-16 women's Championship
With Melbourne Victory 2018–19 
W League Premiership 2018–19
With Melbourne City FC:
W-League Championship:
With Sydney FC:
W-League Premiership: 2009
W-League Championship: 2009

'''With Australia
 AFC Women's Asian Cup Winners: 2010
 AFC Under-16 Women's Championship Winners:2009

Country
Australia
 AFF U-16 Women's Championship: 2009
 2019 Cup of Nations

See also

 Women's association football in Australia

References

External links
 

Australian women's soccer players
Australian Institute of Sport soccer players
Living people
Sydney FC (A-League Women) players
1994 births
2011 FIFA Women's World Cup players
Western Sydney Wanderers FC (A-League Women) players
Melbourne Victory FC (A-League Women) players
Melbourne City FC (A-League Women) players
Newcastle Jets FC (A-League Women) players
Australia women's international soccer players
Women's association football defenders
Western New York Flash players
Expatriate women's soccer players in the United States
Australian expatriate sportspeople in the United States
Australian expatriate women's soccer players
National Women's Soccer League players
A-League Women players
Vålerenga Fotball Damer players
2019 FIFA Women's World Cup players
Expatriate women's footballers in Norway
Australian expatriate sportspeople in Norway
Soccer players from Sydney